= Youssef Gamal =

Egyptian footballer (born 1984)

Personal information
- Date of birth: 1 April 1984 (age 42)
- Place of birth: Egypt
- Position: Striker

Team information
- Current team: El Geish

Youth career
- Ismaily

Senior career*
Years	Team	Apps	(Gls)
2005–2010	Ismaily	?	(?)
2010–	El Geish		

International career
- Egypt
- * Club domestic league appearances and goals

Youssef Gamal (Arabic: يوسف جمال) is an Egyptian football striker who plays for El Geish in the Egyptian Premier League. He joined El Geish in July 2010 after signing a two-season contract.
